Chaypareh County is in West Azerbaijan province, Iran. The capital of the county is the city of Qarah Zia od Din. At the 2006 census, the region's population (as Chaypareh District of Khoy County) was 42,225 in 10,086 households. The following census in 2011 counted 43,206 people in the newly formed Chaypareh County, in 11,775 households. At the 2016 census, the county's population was 47,292 in 13,718 households.

Administrative divisions

The population history and structural changes of Chaypareh County's administrative divisions over three consecutive censuses are shown in the following table. The latest census shows two districts, four rural districts, and one city.

References

 

Counties of West Azerbaijan Province